Cigar ash is the ash produced by a cigar as it is smoked.

Smoking
Connoisseurs of cigars disagree as to whether the quality of a cigar may be determined from the appearance of its ash.

Uses
Cigar ash may be mixed with chalk to make a dentifrice or tooth powder.  It may also be mixed with poppyseed oil to make paint in shades of grey.

Disposal
Usually, during smoking, the ash is an unwanted product that is to be disposed of. An ashtray is used to dispose of ashes and butts without creating a fire hazard. Once it is certain that any burning has been extinguished, the ashtray contents are disposed of.

Sherlock Holmes
The fictional detective Sherlock Holmes was an expert in the study of cigar ash and wrote a monograph, Upon the Distinction Between the Ashes of the Various Tobaccos, about it.  This expertise was used in his cases such as A Study in Scarlet, The Boscombe Valley Mystery and The Hound of the Baskervilles.  This is repeatedly used as an example of deduction or the Baconian method in philosophical accounts of science and reasoning.

See also
 List of cigar brands

References

Cigars
Types of ash